Raoul Kraushaar (August 20, 1908, Paris, France – October 13, 2001, Pompano Beach, Florida) was an American composer who worked on Hollywood feature films in the 1940s and 1950s.

He continued working on low-budget films through the 1960s and 1970s. After that, and up through the 1980s, most of his work centered on television until his retirement; his works included musical compositions for a number of television series, such as The Abbott and Costello Show, Lassie and The Thin Man. He was survived by three children from his first marriage (a son and two daughters) and one from his second; he had nine grandchildren.

His Romanian-born father, Arnold Adolph Kraushaar (1880-1943), an orchestral musician, brought his wife, Rachel (1881-1918), and their baby son, Raoul, to New York as cabin class passengers on board the French transatlantic steamship, La Provence in April 1910. They settled in New York City.

Selected filmography

In Old Monterey (1939)
Melody Ranch (1940)
Shed No Tears (1948)
Sky Liner (1949)
Roll, Thunder, Roll! (1949)
Timber Fury (1950)
The Basketball Fix (1951)
Stagecoach Driver (1951)
The Longhorn (1951)
Canyon Raiders (1951)
Bride of the Gorilla (1951)
Jack and the Beanstalk (1952)
Texas City (1952)
Waco (1952)
Fargo (1952)
Kansas Territory (1952)
Montana Incident (1952)
The Gunman (1952)
The Blue Gardenia (1953)
Invaders From Mars (1953)
The Flaming Urge (1953)
 Run for the Hills (1953)
New Faces (1954)
The Magnificent Matador (1955)
Mohawk (1956)
The Black Whip (1956)
Curucu, Beast of the Amazon (1956)
Mustang! (1959)
Island of Lost Women (1959)
The 30 Foot Bride of Candy Rock (1959)
Jesse James Meets Frankenstein's Daughter (1966)
Billy the Kid Versus Dracula (1966)
An Eye for an Eye (1966)
Cabaret (1972)
Dirty O'Neil (1974)
Sixpack Annie (1975)

Actor
The Anderson Tapes (1971) - Vic D'Medico - Angelo's Lawyer

References

External links
 

1908 births
2001 deaths
American film score composers
20th-century American composers
American male film score composers
20th-century American male musicians
French emigrants to the United States